Acebal may refer to:

Places
Acebal, Santa Fe, a town in Santa Fe, Argentina

People with the surname
Francisco Acebal (1866–1933), Spanish writer, playwright and journalist
Juan María Acebal (1815–1895), Spanish writer